Sheridan  is an 'L' station on the CTA's Red Line. It is an elevated station with two island platforms, located at 3940 North Sheridan Road, in the Lakeview neighborhood of Chicago's Lakeview community area.  Sheridan is the closest 'L' stop to Graceland Cemetery, which is about one-half mile to the west on Irving Park Road.  The Sheridan station is one of only two remaining 'L' stations that were built on S-curves; Indiana on the Green Line is the other. Purple Line weekday rush hour express service use the outside tracks but only a certain number of them stop at this station when the Chicago Cubs have weekday evening home games scheduled.

History

Purple Line connections
Beginning spring 2007 and lasting through 2009, northbound and southbound Purple Line Express trains stop at Sheridan before Chicago Cubs weekday night games in order to provide more service to Wrigley Field, less than a mile from the station. Previously, trains had stopped at the Addison station to the south but that station does not have platform access to the express tracks as Sheridan does, which required Purple Line trains to cross over to the Red Line tracks.  In order to prevent this from adding to delays caused by the Brown Line reconstruction, the stop was moved to Sheridan.

Sheridan also sees frequent use by Red Line passengers traveling to and from Wrigley Field, since Addison is often jammed after Cubs games.

Red & Purple Modernization Project
As part of the Red & Purple Modernization Project, the Sheridan station was proposed to be replaced with a new Irving Park station if the CTA decides not to go with the "no action" alternative.

From March 6, 2015 until October 23, 2017, all Loop-bound Purple Line express trains shared tracks with 95th-bound Red Line trains (and stopped during AM rush hours), due to the Wilson station reconstruction.

Station layout
The station has two island platforms—potentially giving access to all four tracks that run through the station. Red Line trains stop on the inner tracks at all times, and Purple Line Express trains pass through the station via the outer tracks.

Notes and references

Notes

References

External links 

 Sheridan Station Page at Chicago-'L'.org
 Train schedule (PDF) at CTA official site
Sheridan Station Page CTA official site
Sheridan Road entrance from Google Maps Street View

CTA Red Line stations
Railway stations in the United States opened in 1900